Kluky is a municipality and village in Písek District in the South Bohemian Region of the Czech Republic. It has about 600 inhabitants.

Administrative parts
Villages of Březí and Dobešice are administrative parts of Kluky.

References

Villages in Písek District